Dino Porrini (born 26 February 1953) is an Italian former cyclist. He competed in the team time trial event at the 1976 Summer Olympics.

Major results
1978
1st Stage 1 Ruota d'Oro
2nd Trofeo Laigueglia
6th GP Lugano
8th GP Alghero
1979
1st Stage 13 Giro d'Italia
6th Giro di Toscana

References

External links
 

1953 births
Living people
Italian male cyclists
Olympic cyclists of Italy
Cyclists at the 1976 Summer Olympics
Cyclists from the Province of Mantua